Cydia glandicolana is a moth of the family Tortricidae. It is found in China (north east, Huapei, north west, Huantung), the Korean Peninsula, Japan and Russia (Amur).

The wingspan is 14–20 mm. Adults are on wing in July and August in the Russian Far East and in August and September in Japan and Korea. There is one generation per year.

The larvae feed on Castanea mollitissima, Quercus mongolica, Quercus dentate and Quercus serrata. It is an important pest of chestnut in China.

External links
Eurasian Tortricidae

Grapholitini
Insects of Korea
Moths described in 1968
Moths of Japan